Ib Bengtsson (27 May 1927 – 14 December 2002) was a Danish footballer. He played in three matches for the Denmark national football team from 1949 to 1950.

References

External links
 
 

1927 births
2002 deaths
Danish men's footballers
Denmark international footballers
Footballers from Copenhagen
Association football midfielders
Boldklubben Frem players